ʿIyāḍ ibn Mūsā (1083–1149) (formally Abū al-Faḍl ʿIyāḍ ibn Mūsā ibn ʿIyāḍ ibn ʿAmr ibn Mūsā ibn ʿIyāḍ ibn Muḥammad ibn ʿAbd Allāh ibn Mūsā ibn ʿIyāḍ al-Yaḥṣubī al-Sabtī ), was a Sunni polymath and considered the leading scholar in maliki fiqh and hadith in his time. He was a prominent theologian, historian, poet, and genealogist.

Biography

Birth and Education
Iyaḍ was born in Ceuta, Nehemia Levtzion into an established family of Arab origin. As a scion of a notable scholarly family, ʿIyad was able to learn from the best teachers Ceuta had to offer. The judge Abu ʿAbd Allah Muhammad b. ʿIsa (d. 1111) was ʿIyad's first important teacher and is credited with his basic academic formation. Growing up, ʿIyad benefited from the traffic of scholars from al-Andalus, the Maghrib, and the eastern Islamic world. He became a prestigious scholar in his own right and won the support of the highest levels of society.

In his quest for knowledge, Iyad spent part of 1113 and 1114 visiting Cordoba, Murcia,  Almeria, and Granada. He received ijāzas from the most important traditionist of his time, Abū ʿAlī al-Ṣadafī (d. 1120) in Murcia, and met  with some of the most celebrated scholars of the moment, such as Ibn al-Hajj (d. 1134), Ibn Rushd (d. 1126), and Ibn Hamdin (d. 1114).

Career
ʿIyad was appointed judge of Ceuta in 1121 and served in the position until 1136. During his tenure as judge of Ceuta he was extremely prolific. Iyad's overall fame as a jurist and as a writer of fiqh (positive law) was based on the work he did in this city. Iyad was also appointed the judge of Grenada where he worked for just over a year. He was a teacher of Averroes and Ibn Maḍāʾ.

Exile and Death
He headed a revolt against the coming of the Almohades to Ceuta, but lost and was banished to Tadla and later Marrakech.

He died in 1149. He refused to acknowledge Ibn Tumart as the awaited Mahdi. Sources disagree on how and where he died. Some sources, including one written by his son, Muhammad, describe how he ingratiated himself with the Almohads in Marakech and eventually died of sickness during a military campaign. Other sources describe how he died a natural death while acting as a rural judge near Tadla, while later sources tend to assume a violent death at the hands of the Almohads. Although he was opposed to the Almohads and the ideas of Ibn Hazm, he did not hold enmity for the Zahirite school of Sunni Islam, which the Almohads and Ibn Hazm followed. Ayyad's comments on Ibn Hazm's teacher Abu al-Khiyar al-Zahiri were positive, as was Ayyad's characterization of his own father, a Zahirite theologian.

Influence
In doctrine Iyad to known have  influenced later scholars like  Ibn Taymiyyah and Taqī ad-Dīn as-Subkī (d.1355) in expanding the definition of heresy in apostasy, being the first to call for the death penalty for those Muslims guilty of “disseminating improprieties about Muḥammad or questioning his authority in all questions of faith and profane life” (according to Tilman Nagel).

Cadi Ayyad University, also known as the University of Marrakech, was named after him. Qadi Ayyad is also well known as one of the seven saints of Marrakech and is buried near Bab Aïlen.

Works

He was one of the most famous scholars of Maliki law and author of the well-known Ash-Shifa on the virtues of the prophet and Tartib al-mardarik wa-taqrib al-masalik li-marifat alam madhab Malik, a collection of biographies of eminent Malikis, a.o. Abu Bakr ibn al-Arabi. Qadi `Iyad's other well-known works include:

Ikmal al-mu`lim bi fawa'id Muslim, a famous commentary on Sahih Muslim which transmitted and expanded upon al-Maziri's own commentary, al-Mu`lim bi-fawa'id Muslim. Qadi `Iyad's own commentary was utilised and expounded upon heavily by Al-Nawawi in his own commentary of Sahih Muslim.
Bughya al-ra'i lima Tadmanahu Hadith Umm Zara` min al-Fawa'id, published with Tafsir nafs al-Hadith by Al-Suyuti.
al-I`lam bi Hudud Qawa'id al-Islam, written on the five pillars of Islam.
al-Ilma` ila Ma`rifa Usul al-Riwaya wa Taqyid al-Sama`, a detailed work on the science of Hadith.
Mashariq al-Anwar `ala Sahih al-Athar, based on al-Muwatta of Malik ibn Anas, Sahih Al-Bukhari of Imam Bukhari and Sahih Muslim by Muslim ibn al-Hajjaj.
al-Tanbihat al-Mustanbata `ala al-kutub al-Mudawwana wa al-Mukhtalata.
Daqa`iq al-akhbar fi dhikr al-janna wa-l-nar, an "eschatological manual" describing the joys of jannah (heaven) and the horrors of jahannam (hell)

See also 
 List of Ash'aris and Maturidis

References

Bibliography
 Dictionnaire historique de l'islam, de Janine Sourdel et Dominique Sourdel, édition PUF.
 Ahmad al Maqqari al Tilimsani, Azhar al Riyad fi Akhbar al Qadi 'Ayyad (biography and works of Qadi Ayyad), 5 volumes
 "Qadi Iyad's Rebellion against the Almohads in Sabtah (A. H. 542–543/A. D. 1147–1148) New Numismatic Evidence", by Hanna E. Kassis, Journal of the American Oriental Society, Vol. 103, No. 3 (July–Septempber, 1983), pp. 504–514

External links
 Islamophile.org, extensive article on his life and work, in French
 His grave, the Koubba Cadi Ayyad, near Bab Aylen in Marrakesh  Cadi Ayyad Ben Moussa : les tombeaux de Marrakech

References 

People from Ceuta
Malikis
Asharis
1083 births
1149 deaths
Hadith scholars
Almohad historians
12th-century jurists
12th-century Arabic writers
12th-century Moroccan historians
12th-century writers from al-Andalus